Anne of Austria (16 August 1573 – 10 February 1598) was Queen of Poland and Sweden as the first consort of King Sigismund III Vasa.

Biography

Anne was a daughter of Charles II of Austria and Maria Anna of Bavaria. She was the grandchild of Ferdinand I, Holy Roman Emperor and Anne of Bohemia and Hungary (1503–1547).

Her mother was an important supporter of the Counter-Reformation in Inner Austria, who gave her children an upbringing focused on Catholicism. The siblings were made to attend church from the age of one, their first words were to be Jesus and Mary, they were tutored by Catholic priests, and Latin was to be a priority before their native German language. As a child, Anna was called "Andle", and she was taught to translate Ribadeneyra's Vita Ignatii Loyolæ from Latin to German. Outside of Latin and Catholicism, she was mainly tutored in household tasks such as sewing and cooking.

Marriage
In 1577, the Papal envoy to Sweden, Possevino, suggested that the children of King John III of Sweden be married to children of the Habsburg dynasty. This was in a period when Sweden was close to a Counter-Reformation under John III and his Polish queen Catherine Jagiellon. The Pope gave his approval to the idea of a marriage alliance between Habsburg and Sweden in the persons of Anna and Sigismund, as did the Polish king and queen, and when visiting Graz in 1578, Possevino acquired a portrait of Anna to bring with him on his next visit to the Swedish court. 

Soon after, however, a new proposal was made to arrange a marriage between Anna and Henry of Lorraine to prevent French expansion in Lorraine, and for a while, these plans were given priority. In 1585, Anna accompanied her parents to the Imperial court in Vienna and Prague, unofficially to investigate a possible marriage to her cousin the Emperor, but those plans did not come to fruition either. 

In 1586-1587, when Prince Sigismund of Sweden was elected king of Poland, his maternal aunt, Queen Anna Jagiellon, resummed the old plans of a marriage between Sigismund and Anna. Anna's parents, however, still preferred the match with Henry of Lorraine, especially because of the political instability in Poland, the opposition of chancellor Jan Zamoisky and Archbishop Maximilian's desire for the Polish crown. In 1589, the Polish court opted for Maria Anna of Bavaria instead. In 1591, however, the Emperor finally decided that a marriage to Sigismund would be the match for Anna which would best benefit the Habsburg dynasty. Count Gustaf Brahe was sent as an envoy to Graz, other formalities were negotiated by Sigismund's favorite cardinal Georg Radziwil, and Anna, who was personally unwilling, was told to obey the Emperor's command.

In April 1592, the betrothal was formally celebrated in the Imperial Court in Vienna; on 4 May, a proxy wedding was celebrated, after which Anna and her mother departed for the wedding in Krakow. Anne became the first wife of Sigismund of Poland on 31 May 1592. This marriage was opposed by many szlachta (nobles) of the Polish–Lithuanian Commonwealth, who were opposed to the alliance with the Austrian Habsburgs that Sigismund pursued.

When Sigismund sent Cardinal Radziwill to Prague for his bride, the anti-Habsburg party with chancellor Jan Zamoyski guarded the borders to prevent the Archduchess from entering the country. Anne evaded the guards, arrived in Kraków, and was crowned in May 1592 by Primas Karnkowski as the Queen of Poland. Later, during her lifetime, the capital of the Commonwealth was moved from Kraków to Warsaw.

Queen
Anna was described as attractive and intelligent. She acquired the confidence and love of the introvert Sigismund, and their relationship was described as a happy one, with her functioning as his support during the many trials of the politically unstable 1590s.

Sigismund became king of Sweden as well in 1592, and the king and queen were required to go to Sweden to be crowned. The Poles did not want Sigismund to leave Poland, and demanded that Anna remain in Poland as a hostage. Sigismund rejected this condition, and they departed for Sweden in 1593.

The voyage to Sweden was difficult, and Anne was pregnant. Anne did not like Sweden, nor did she make a good impression on the Swedes: raised as a fervent Catholic, she strongly disapproved of the Protestant Swedes, whom she regarded as heretics, and could not tolerate the Lutheran clergy. She became involved in a conflict with the Protestant Dowager Queen Gunilla Bielke, whom she accused of having stolen valuables from the Royal Palace. She felt a strong mistrust toward her husband's Swedish Protestant uncle, Duke Charles. She was crowned as the Queen of Sweden in Uppsala Cathedral on 19 February 1594, but because the ceremony was a Protestant one, she viewed it as an empty ceremony of no consequence. Her political influence as the confidant of Sigismund was noted, and Anne and her Jesuit confessor Sigismund Ehrenhöffer acted as a channel between the king and the Papal envoy Germanico Malaspina, to whom they gave information about the king's policy.

In April 1594 in Stockholm, she gave birth to daughter, Catherine, whose baptism was elaborately celebrated at the Swedish court, but the child died soon after.

The Poles had demanded that she leave her daughter Anna Maria behind her as hostage in Poland during their stay in Sweden. She had also been afraid that the Swedes would demand to keep her daughter Catherine (born in Sweden) when she returned to Poland.  On her departure from Sweden in July 1594, she was granted the towns of Linköping, Söderköping, and Stegeborg as personal domains on the condition that she respect the Protestant belief within these fiefs.

Upon their return to Poland, Anne acted as the confidant of Sigismund. She advised him on navigating between the Polish noble factions, on the League against the Ottoman Empire, and especially on the relationship between Poland  and the Habsburg dynasty. She had however no interest in maintaining the personal union between Catholic Poland and Protestant Sweden, and used her influence to oppose the plan to have her son Wladislaus succeed Sweden by sending him there to be brought up a Protestant.

Anne died on 10 February 1598 in Warsaw as a result of haemorrhage during the birth of her last child, who also died then. Sigismund III then married her sister Constance Renate of Habsburg.

Issue
Anna had five children, but only Władysław lived to become an adult:
Anna Maria (23 May 1593 – 9 February 1600)
Catherine (19 April 1594 – 16 May 1594)
Władysław (9 June 1595 – 20 May 1648), (reigned 1632-1648 as Władysław IV of Poland)
Catherine (27 September 1596 – 2 June 1597)
Christopher (10 February 1598 – 10 February 1598)

Ancestors

Gallery

References

Citations

Sources
 Anteckningar om svenska qvinnor (Swedish)
 Europe in the sixteenth-century, Andrew Pettegree, 2002, 
  Den svenska historien. 4. Gustav Vasa. Riket formas (The History of Sweden. 4. Gustav Vasa. The empire is formed), Gunvor Grenholm, Jan Cornell, Jerker Rosén, Sten Carlsson and Svenolov Ehrén, 1978,

Further reading 
 

1573 births
1598 deaths
People from Graz
Polish queens consort
Anna 1592
16th-century House of Habsburg
Austrian princesses
Grand Duchesses of Lithuania
Burials at Wawel Cathedral
Polish Roman Catholics
Deaths in childbirth
Daughters of monarchs